A flail is an agricultural tool used for threshing, the process of separating grains from their husks.

It is usually made from two or more large sticks attached by a short chain; one stick is held and swung, causing the other (the swipple) to strike a pile of grain, loosening the husks. The precise dimensions and shape of flails were determined by generations of farmers to suit the particular grain they were harvesting. Flails for other grains, such as rice or spelt, would have had different dimensions.

Flails have generally fallen into disuse in many nations because of the availability of technologies such as combine harvesters that require much less manual labour. But in many places, such as Minnesota, wild rice can only be harvested legally using manual means, specifically through the use of a canoe and a flail that is made of smooth, round wood no more than 30 inches long.

 

Non-agricultural uses 

As with most agricultural tools, flails were often used as weapons by farmers lacking better weapons. The flail is proposed as one of the origins of the two-piece baton known in the Okinawan kobudō weapon system as the nunchaku. The first recorded use of a flail as a weapon was at the siege of Damietta in 1218 during the Fifth Crusade, as depicted in the chronicle by Matthew Paris; tradition has it the man was the Frisian Hayo of Wolvega who bashed the standard bearer of the Muslim defenders with it and captured the flag.  Flails were also used as weapons by farmers under the leadership of Jan Žižka during the 15th-century Hussite Wars in Bohemia.

In ancient Egypt the flail was a symbol associated with the pharaoh, symbolizing the monarch's ability to provide for the people.

See also
 Gohei
 Ōnusa

References

External links 

 Antique Farm Tools
 Agriculture in Victorian Times
 Picture of one kind of rice flail

Egyptian artefact types
Threshing tools
Mechanical hand tools
Wands
Ritual weapons
Honorary weapons
Ceremonial weapons